Carolyn Frances "Lindy" Jenkins is a justice with the Supreme Court of Western Australia, appointed on 2 February 2004. She previously served on the District Court of Western Australia. Prior to her judicial appointments, she was a Crown Prosecutor in the Northern Territory and a lawyer at the Crown Solicitor's Office in Western Australia.

References

 

Judges of the Supreme Court of Western Australia
Australian women judges
Macquarie University alumni
1959 births
Living people
Judges of the District Court of Western Australia
21st-century Australian judges
21st-century women judges